Cha Cha is the soundtrack to the 1979 Dutch film Cha Cha, written by Herman Brood and directed by Herbert Curiel. It features songs by Herman Brood and his band The Wild Romance, Nina Hagen, Lene Lovich, Les Chappell, and others.

Upon its release, the soundtrack received positive reviews and was a commercial success in Netherlands where it peaked at number twenty-eight and was certified platinum by NVPI. The single "Never Be Clever" by Herman Brood & His Wild Romance was also successful in Dutch charts peaking at number ten.

Track listing

Charts

Certifications and sales

References

External links
 [ Cha Cha] at AllMusic
 

Herman Brood & His Wild Romance albums
Nina Hagen albums
Lene Lovich albums
Film soundtracks
1979 soundtrack albums
Ariola Records albums